Naj, naj (English: Best, Best) is the ninth studio album by the Bosnian Serb singer Stoja. It was released in 2009.

The song "Splav II" features background vocals by Suzana Dinić and the first six tracks feature backing vocals by Ivana Selakov.

Track listing

References

2009 albums
Stoja albums
Grand Production albums